Pawlikowski (feminine Pawlikowska) is a Polish surname. Notable people with this surname include:

 Adam Pawlikowski (1925–1976), Polish film actor
 Aniela Pawlikowska, Polish artist
 Ellen M. Pawlikowski (born 1956), commander of the Space and Missile Systems Center of the United States' Air Force Space Command
 John T. Pawlikowski (born 1940), Servite priest and Professor of Social Ethics at the Catholic Theological Union
 Józef Pawlikowski (1767–1828), Polish noble
 Krzysztof Pawlikowski (born 1946), Polish-New Zealand academic
 Łukasz Pawlikowski (born 1997), Polish cellist
 Maciej Pawlikowski (born 1953), Polish mountaineer
 Maria Pawlikowska-Jasnorzewska, Polish poet
 Paweł Pawlikowski (born 1957), Polish BAFTA Award-winning filmmaker
 Zoogz Rift (born Robert Pawlikowski; 1953–2011), musician, painter and professional wrestling personality

Polish-language surnames